Praxis porphyretica, the brown praxis, is a moth of the family Noctuidae. The species was first described by Achille Guenée in 1858. It is found in the Australian Capital Territory, New South Wales, Queensland, Tasmania and Victoria.

References

Catocalinae
Moths of Australia
Moths described in 1858